Central Christian College may refer to:

Central Christian College of Kansas, a private college in McPherson, Kansas
Central Christian College of the Bible, a private college in Moberly, Missouri